Danish Crown is an internationally oriented Danish food company with butchery operations, processing and sales of primarily pork and beef. Through a number of subsidiaries, the group is widely represented within the food industry with various food products. The CEO is Jais Valeur and the headquarters are located in Randers.

The Danish Crown group is owned by 5,620 Danish farmers, and annually the group is part of 49 billion meals for consumers worldwide. The group has a turnover of approximately DKK 60 billion kroner and employs approximately 26,600 employees across 89 production sites, 40 warehouses and 38 offices across 30 countries.

The group is the world's largest pork exporter and Europe's largest producer of pork. The Danish Crown group is also Europe's largest meat processing company, just as the group is a significant player on the European beef market.

In the financial year 2020/21, Danish Crown's exports amounted to DKK 24 billion kroner. This corresponds to approx. 20% of Danish food exports and approx. 3% of Danish merchandise exports.

History
The first Danish cooperative pig abattoir was established in Horsens, Denmark in 1887. In the following 40-50 years, a large number of cooperative pig abattoirs were established across the country. In 1960, the cooperative abattoirs began to merge in order to better have the strength to carry out the tasks with, among other things, sales, marketing and product development. In 1998, Danish Crown and Vestjyske Slagterier merged.

In April 2002, the Danish Competition Council gave permission for a merger between Danish Crown and Steff Houlberg, and a large part of the original cooperative pig abattoirs is part of the new Danish Crown.

On October 13th 2010, the shareholders decided to transfer the activities to a limited company, Danish Crown A/S formerly Danish Crown Holding A/S. The co-operatives retained ownership through the co-operative, which is now called the Danish Crown Amba Supply Company. The limited company was originally established on July 1st 2001.

On 13 October 2010 the members voted to change Danish Crown from a cooperative to a joint stock company.

Danish Crown group 
Danish Crown
 Head office Randers
 Abattoir Skærbæk
 Abattoir Blans
 Abattoir  Herning
 Abattoir Horsens
 Abattoir Ringsted
 Abattoir Sæby
 Abattoir Rønne
 Abattoir Essen
 Abattoir Oldenburg
 Abattoir Boizenburg
 Abbattoir Kolo
 Soup factory Esbjerg
 Processing factory Herning
 Processing factory Kolding
 Processing factory Låsby
 Processing factory Svenstrup
 Processing factory Thorning
 Processing factory Aabenraa
 Processing factory Schüttorf
 Processing factory Pinghu
 Processing factory Bonnetable
 Processing factory Jönköping
 Processing factory Haarlem

Danish Crown Beef
 Headoffice/abattoir Holsted
 Abattoir Aalborg
 Abattoir Husum
 Abattoir Teterow
 Processing factory Sdr. Felding

Subsidiaries
 Sokolow
 ESS-FOOD
 DAT-Schaub
 KLS Ugglarps
 Scan-Hide
 SPF-Danmark A/S
 Agri-Norcold A/S

References

External links 
 

Food manufacturers of Denmark
Companies based in Randers Municipality
Meat companies
Danish companies established in 1898